Astralium tentorium is a species of sea snail, a marine gastropod mollusk in the family Turbinidae, the turban snails.

Description
The size of the shell varies between 30 mm and 50 mm.

Distribution
This marine species is endemic to Australia and occurs in the subtidal zone off Western Australia.

References

 Thiele, J. 1930. Gastropoda und Bivalvia. pp. 561–596 in Michaelsen, W. & Hartmayer, R. (eds). Die Fauna Südwest-Australiens. Jena : Gustav Fischer Vol. 5
 Ponder, W.F. 1978. The unfigured Mollusca of J. Thiele. 1930 published in Die Fauna Sudwest-Australiens. Records of the Western Australian Museum 6(4): 423–441 
 Wilson, B. 1993. Australian Marine Shells. Prosobranch Gastropods. Kallaroo, Western Australia : Odyssey Publishing Vol. 1 408 pp.

External links
 

tentorium
Gastropods described in 1930